Héctor Morales may refer to:

 Héctor Morales (footballer, born 1985), Mexican footballer for Cafetaleros de Tapachula
 Héctor Morales (footballer, born 1993), Cuban footballer
 Héctor Gabriel Morales (born 1989), Argentinian footballer for Ferencvárosi TC
 Héctor Morales (actor) (born 1982), Chilean actor starring in Tony Manero, Martín Rivas or Chipe Libre
 Hector Morales (diplomat) (born 1954), United States Ambassador to the Organization of American States from 2007 to 2009